There are several rivers named Papagaio River in Brazil:

 Papagaio River (Amazonas)
 Papagaio River (Mato Grosso)

See also
 Papagaio (disambiguation)
 Dos Papagaios River, Paraná, Brazil
 Papagayo River, Mexico